On 28 November 2021, religiously motivated arsonists destroyed a police station in Charsadda District, Khyber Pakhtunkhwa, Pakistan.

Background

In Pakistan, blasphemy is a very serious crime which carries the death penalty. The Pakistani government have sentenced some prisoners convicted of blasphemy to death, but have not executed anyone. Some blasphemy suspects have been lynched. Domestic and international human rights groups have said that these laws can be abused and used to persecute religious minorities and to take revenge for personal reasons.

Arrest of blasphemy suspect
On 28 November 2021, police arrested an apparently seriously mentally-ill man for allegedly desecrating a Quran by tearing out some its pages. He was taken to Mandani police station in Tangi Tehsil, Charsadda District, Khyber Pakhtunkhwa, northwest Pakistan.

Attack
Later on the day of the arrest, a group of protesters, whom the police described as a mob of four to five thousand people, gathered outside the police station. They demanded the police hand the suspect to them. The police refused to do so, and during the night the protesters attacked the station, stealing weapons and burning the building down. They also set fire to the vehicles in its car park. The police fled, taking the suspect to an undisclosed location. Following the attack, the mob set fire to a police check post on Harichand Road. They blocked the road and staged a sit-in there. The police dispersed them; eyewitnesses said the police used tear gas and aerial firing to do so.

Reaction
Later, local leaders of Deobandi Sunni political party Jamiat Ulema-e-Islam (F) demonstrated in Mandani bazaar, demanding the suspect be punished.

References

2021 crimes in Pakistan
2021 in Khyber Pakhtunkhwa
2020s crimes in Khyber Pakhtunkhwa
Arson in Pakistan
Arson in the 2020s
Attacks on buildings and structures in 2021
Attacks on buildings and structures in Khyber Pakhtunkhwa
Attacks on police stations in Asia
Attacks on police stations in the 2020s
Arson attack
November 2021 crimes in Asia